Rustle, rustler, rustlers or rustling may refer to:

Livestock theft 
 Cattle rustling, the theft of cattle
 Horse rustling, the theft of horses
 Bee rustling, the theft of bees

Arts, entertainment and media
 Rustlers (1919 film), an American short Western 
 Rustlers (1949 film), an American Western
 King City Rustler, and American local weekly newspaper

Businesses and organisations
 Rustlers (convenience food), a range of burgers and hot sandwiches made by Kepak 
 Rustler Steak House, an American steakhouse chain
 Rustler Yachts, a British yachtbuilder

Other uses
 Rustle noise, a noise consisting of aperiodic pulses
 Rustler Formation, a geologic formation in Texas
 Rustler Peak, a summit in the U.S. state of Oregon
 Mazda Rustler, a version of the Ford Bantam pickup truck

See also

 Frühlingsrauschen ('Rustle of Spring'), a solo piano piece by Christian Sinding